Quantrill or Quantrell is a surname of English origin. Notable people with the surname include:

Alf Quantrill (1897–1968), British footballer
Cal Quantrill (born 1995), Canadian baseball pitcher
Malcolm Quantrill (1931–2009), British architect
Paul Quantrill (born 1968), Canadian former Major League Baseball pitcher
William Quantrill (1837–1865), Confederate guerrilla leader during the American Civil War
William Quantrill (diplomat) (born 1939), British former diplomat

English-language surnames